Gustavo Fernández defeated Gordon Reid in the final, 6–1, 6–3 to win the men's singles wheelchair tennis title at the 2019 French Open. It was his second French Open singles title and fourth major singles title overall.

Shingo Kunieda was the defending champion, but was defeated by Reid in the semifinals.

Seeds

Draw

Finals

References
 Draw

Wheelchair Men's Singles
French Open, 2019 Men's Singles